

Introduction
All the figures shown here have been sourced from the International Data Base (IDB) Division of the United States Census Bureau. Every individual value has been rounded to the nearest thousand, to assure data coherence, particularly when adding up (sub)totals. Although data from specific statistical offices may be more accurate, the information provided here has the advantage of being homogeneous.

Population estimates, as long as they are based on recent censuses, can be more easily projected into the near future than many macroeconomic indicators, such as GDP, which are much more sensitive to political and/or economic crises. This means that demographic estimates for the next five (or even ten) years can be more accurate than the projected evolution of GDP over the same time period (which may also be distorted by inflation).

However, no projected population figures can be considered exact. As the IDB states, "figures beyond the years 2020-2025 should be taken with caution", as the "census way towards those years has yet to be paved". Thus projections can be said to be looking through a kind of "cloudy glass" or a "misty window": realistically, the projections are "guesstimates".

To make things complicated, not all countries carry out censuses regularly, especially some of the poorer, faster-growing sub-Saharan African nations (whose evolution may be more interesting, from a demographer's point of view, than the "stagnated" populations of countries like Germany or Italy). As is well known from the statistics, the population of many sub-Saharan nations, as well as other nations like Egypt, Iraq, and Pakistan, with their low level of family planning, are growing much faster than in the aging European nations or Japan. 

On the other hand, some other countries, like the small Asian state of Bhutan, have only recently had a thorough census for the first time: In Bhutan's case in particular, before its national 2005 population survey, the IDB estimated its population at over 2 million; this was drastically reduced when the new census results were finally included in its database.

Besides, the IDB usually takes some time before including new data, as happened in the case of Indonesia. That country was reported by the IDB to have an inflated population of some 242 million by mid-2005, because it had not still processed the final results of the 2000 Indonesian census. There was a similar discrepancy with the relatively recent Ethiopian 2007 census, which gave a preliminary result of "only" 73,918,505 inhabitants.

The largest absolute potential discrepancies are naturally related to the most populous nations. However, smaller states, such as Tuvalu, can have large relative discrepancies. For instance, the 2002 census in that Oceanian island, which gave a final population of 9,561 shows that IDB estimates can be significantly off.

Preliminary notes
The national 1 July, mid-year population estimates (usually based on past national censuses) supplied in these tables are given in thousands.

The table columns can be sorted by clicking on their respective heading.

The retrospective figures use the present-day names and world political division: for example, the table gives data for each of the 15 republics of the former Soviet Union, as if they had already been independent in 1950. The opposite is the case for Germany, which had been divided since the end of the Second World War but was reunified on October 3, 1990.

Other issues concerning some countries or territories are as follows:

 Burma is the traditional English name for (the Union of) Myanmar, as used by the United States Census Bureau.
 The Democratic Republic of the Congo, formerly known as Zaire from 1971 to 1997, is referred to as Congo (Kinshasa) in the IDB database (to differentiate it from the Republic of the Congo whose capital is the city of Brazzaville).
 The population figures for France include the four overseas departments of French Guiana, Guadeloupe, Martinique, and Réunion, but exclude Saint Barthélemy and the French part of Saint Martin, which split from Guadeloupe in 2007.
  The former British colony of Hong Kong and former Portuguese colony of Macau continue to have their own figures, even though they returned to Chinese sovereignty in 1997 and 1999 respectively. The Chinese government considers both these present-day Special Administrative Regions (SARs) as separate entities from a statistical point of view, and their censuses are still carried out on different dates from mainland China.
 About half the population of the British Caribbean colony of Montserrat (in the Lesser Antilles) was evacuated in 1995, following a volcanic eruption that severely damaged its capital, the town of Plymouth.
 Although no figures are given for the Palestinian territories as a whole, data is supplied for both the Gaza Strip and the West Bank.
 The Serbian population refers only to that of the "residual" Yugoslav republic under that name, after secession of Montenegro (Crna Gora) and, more recently, Kosovo (the latter being recognized as an independent state by the United States government on 18 February 2008, the U.S. Census Bureau reflects the resulting demographic change; nevertheless, many countries have not recognized this declaration of independence).

Finally, the Eastern and Western Europe subtotals follow the former Cold War's Iron Curtain division of Europe.

Formulas used to calculate demographic growth
To the right of each year column (except for the initial 1950 one), a percentage figure is shown, which gives the average annual growth for the previous five-year period. Thus, the figures after the 1960 column show the percentage annual growth for the 1955-60 period; the figures after the 1980 column calculate the same value for 1975–80; and so on.

The formulas used for the annual growth rates are the standard ones, used both by the United Nations Statistics Division and by National Census Offices worldwide. They are compound growth rates, and have the general form:where  and  stand for the initial and final population, respectively, within a stated time period.

In the calculations shown here, all the periods are of five years, and so yi + 5 = yf, so the formula simplifies to.

Estimates between the years 1950 and 1980 (in thousands)

Estimates between the years 1985 and 2015 (in thousands)

Estimates between the years 2020 and 2050 (in thousands)

Source
 United States Census Bureau - International Data Base (IDB), July 2015 edition (retrieved on October 20, 2015). The current version of the International Data Base website gives updated population estimates for the years 1950-2100 for all countries (except the United States: 1950-2060), as well as the World total for the years 1950-2060.

See also
List of countries and dependencies by population
List of countries by past and projected GDP (PPP)
List of countries by population in 2000
List of countries by population in 2005
List of countries by population in 2010
List of countries by population in 2015
World population

References

External links
The United Nations Division of Economic and Social Affairs, Population Division provides official UN estimates and projections of country populations 
City population provides demographic data not only for cities, but also for countries (and their primary administrative divisions), sometimes going back to the 1980s.
GeoHive page with historic, current and future population by country, also based on the United States Census Bureau International Data Base.
Population statistics has a collection of demographic statistics from every country and territory, some of them going back centuries.
Statoids gives historical and present-day census data about countries and territories, and figures for their first (and even second) level administrative divisions.
 includes present-day national population projections, going back to the 1990s in some cases.
International Futures (IFs) is an integrated global modeling system that forecasts demographic, economic, energy, agricultural, socio-political, and environmental subsystems for 183 countries interacting in the global system.

Lists of countries by population
Population geography